Sarkis II the Relic-Carrier was the Catholicos of Armenian Apostolic Church in 1469–1474.

References

Catholicoi of Armenia
15th-century Oriental Orthodox archbishops